Abdulmalik Al Khalili is a politician from Oman who is serving as Chairmen of the Council of State of Oman of 3rd Council of state.

References 

Year of birth missing (living people)
21st-century Omani politicians
Living people